The following is a list of the 121 municipalities (comuni) of the Metropolitan City of Rome Capital, formerly the Province of Rome, Lazio, Italy.

List

See also
List of municipalities of Italy

References

 
Rome